The Latin American Studies Association (LASA) is the largest association for scholars of Latin American studies. Founded in 1966, it has over 12,000 members, 45 percent of whom reside outside the United States (36 percent in Latin America and the Caribbean), LASA brings together experts on Latin America from all disciplines and diverse occupational endeavors, across the globe.

History

LASA was founded in 1966 following a meeting sponsored by the Joint Committee on Latin American Studies (composed of the Social Science Research Council (SSRC) and the American Council of Learned Societies (ACLS), held at the Hispanic Foundation (now the Hispanic Division) of the Library of Congress, May 7, 1966. LASA's constitution and bylaws were drafted and on May 12, 1966 it was incorporated in Washington, D.C., as a legal, tax exempt organization, "non-profit professional body created by scholarly area specialists to meet their particular and growing needs." The incorporation of the LASA was the culmination of a long process to create such an organization after the failure of a previous attempt.  In April 1958, Howard F. Cline, Director of the Hispanic Foundation of the Library of Congress (1952–71) and the ACLS organized a conference to explore the creation of a coordinating body for Latin American area studies.  In 1959, the ACLS and the SSRC formed the Joint Committee on Latin American Studies, which ultimately led to the founding of LASA as an organization. The Constitution and Bylaws of the Latin American Studies Association were published in the Latin American Research Review in 1966. LASA's first President after its 1966 incorporation was political scientist Kalman Silvert, who published extensively on Latin American political systems and conflict. LASA honors Silvert's memory with a major prize.

Mission 
LASA's mission is "to foster intellectual discussion, research, and teaching on Latin America, the Caribbean, and its people throughout the Americas, promote the interests of its diverse membership, and encourage civic engagement through network building and public debate."

LASA Congresses 
Every year, specialists on Latin America gather at the LASA International Congress. Featuring over 900 sessions, including plenary sessions and informal meetings, the Congress is the world's premier forum for expert discussion on Latin America and the Caribbean. The theme of the 2019 Boston LASA Congress is “Justice and Inclusion"

Regional Subgroups 
At the 1992 LASA Congress in Los Angeles, scholars specializing in Brazil founded the Brazilian Studies Association (BRASA).  BRASA now holds independent biennial meetings.

LASA Presidents 

 Gerardo Otero (Simon Fraser University), 2021-2022
 Gioconda Herrera (Facultad Latinoamericana de Ciencias Sociales (FLACSO) Ecuador), 2020-2021
 Mara Viveros-Vigoya (Universidad Nacional de Colombia), 2019-2020
 Lynn M. Stephen (University of Oregon), 2018-2019
 Aldo Panfichi (Pontificia Universidad Católica del Perú) 2017-2018
 Joanne Rappaport Georgetown University 2016-2017
 Gilbert Joseph (Yale University) 2015-2016
 Debra Castillo (Cornell University) 2014-2015
 Merilee Grindle (Harvard University), 2013-2014
 Evelyne Huber (University of North Carolina, Chapel Hill), 2012-2013
 Maria Hermínia Tavares de Almeida (Universidade de São Paulo), 2010-2012
 John Coatsworth (Columbia University), (historian) 2009-2010
 Eric Hershberg (American University), 2007-2009
 Charles R. Hale (University of Texas, Austin), 2006-2007
 Sonia E. Alvarez (University of Massachusetts, Amherst), 2004-2006
 Marysa Navarro (Dartmouth College), 2003-2004
 Arturo Arias (University of Redlands), 2001-2003
 Thomas Holloway (University of California, Davis), 2000-2001
 Franklin W. Knight (Johns Hopkins University), (historian) 1998-2000
 Susan Eckstein (Boston University), 1997-1998
 Jane Jaquette (Occidental College), 1995-1997
 Cynthia McClintock (George Washington University), (political scientist) 1994-1995
 Carmen Diana Deere (University of Massachusetts, Amherst), 1992-1994
 Lars Schoultz (University of North Carolina), 1991-1992
 Jean Franco (Columbia University), 1989-1991
 Paul Drake (University of California, San Diego), 1988-1989
 Cole Blasier (University of Pittsburgh), 1986-1988
 Wayne Cornelius (University of California, San Diego), (political scientist) 1985-1986
 Helen M. Safa (University of Florida), 1983-1985
 Jorge I. Domínguez (Harvard University), (political scientist) 1982-1983. Stripped of his LASA membership January 2020.
 Peter H. Smith (University of California, San Diego), 1981-1982
 Carmelo Mesa-Lago (University of Pittsburgh), 1980-1981
 William P. Glade 1979-1980
 Riordan Roett 1978-1979
 Evelyn P. Stevens 1976-1978
 Richard R. Fagen 1975-1976
 Paul L. Doughty 1974-1975
 Henry A. Landsberger 1973-1974
 Thomas Skidmore 1972-1973
 Federico G. Gil 1971-1972
 John J. Johnson 1970-1971
 John P. Augelli 1969-1970
 Richard Newbold Adams 1968-1969
 Kalman H. Silvert (political scientist) 1967-1968

Awards
 LASA/OXFAM Martin Diskin Dissertation Award
 Bryce Wood Book Award
 LASA/Oxfam America Martin Diskin Memorial Lectureship
 Premio Iberoamericano Book Award
 LASA Media Award
 Kalman H. Silvert Award - named for the first president of LASA
 Luciano Tomassini Award 
 Charles A. Hale Fellowship for Mexican History - named for University of Iowa historian of Mexican liberalism
 Guillermo O'Donnell Democracy Award and Lectureship
 Howard F. Cline Book Prize in Mexican History, named for a founder of LASA

Publishing 
LASA publishes an interdisciplinary scholarly journal, the Latin American Research Review (LARR) founded in 1965 by a consortium of U.S. universities.  LARR is an interdisciplinary journal that publishes original research and surveys of current research on Latin America and the Caribbean. 

LASA has established a publishing house, the Latin American Research Commons, that publishes LARR and other books and journals.

References

External links 
 LASA website

Latin American studies
Learned societies of the United States
Organizations established in 1966
1966 establishments in Washington, D.C.